Dreamland (2000) is a teen novel by the American author Sarah Dessen.

Plot summary
The book is split into three parts.

Part I: Cass

Part II: Rogerson

Caitlin and Rogerson's relationship becomes more physical. Rogerson introduces Caitlin to drugs and a woman in her mid-twenties named Corinna. They become best friends and begin to smoke pot.

Caitlin begins to forget school which causes her to not attend classes and fail every class possible. Rogerson helps her with this, claiming that "he knows everything."

Caitlin soon begins to be abused by Rogerson when she does not tell Rogerson where she is, and when she is seen talking to other boys. Caitlin begins writing in the gift that she received from Cass, a dream journal. Caitlin begins to see Cass in a TV show that Cass's boyfriend works on. Caitlin's mom engages in the show, not caring about what's happening but finally seeing her daughter again.

On Christmas Eve, Caitlin finally agrees to sleep with Rogerson. She says later in the book that whenever they have sex it is the only time she feels safe.

One day, Caitlin's friend, Rina, decides to take her out for some fun. They go to Rina's step fathers' lake house, but Caitlin was terrified because she knew that Rogerson was waiting outside of her house. She tried calling him, but he never picked up the phone.

Caitlin walks away and heads home. She sees Rogerson parked in front of her house. She gets into his car and Rogerson becomes angry with her and begins to abuse her, until she is pushed out of the car. He continues to abuse her until Caitlin's mother shoves Rogerson away from her and calls for help. One of the neighbors calls the police, and Rogerson is arrested.

Part III: Me

Caitlin joins the Evergreen Rest Care Facility after Rogerson is arrested. She comes in because of drug addiction, and after all Rogerson did to her, she still loved Rogerson. She starts counseling and begins a slow improvement.

Caitlin gets a letter from her friend, Corinna, saying that she left her longtime boyfriend, Dave, and is in Arizona living her life, trying to forget her past. She says she hopes to see Caitlin again soon. She also gets a letter from her sister, Cass, saying that she did not want to go to Yale. She was having a tough time and wasn't happy with her parents' plans for college, which explains her sudden departure. She wanted to be able to do what she wanted to do with her life, and if her parents knew where she was they would try and come get her.

Rina tells Caitlin that she ran into Rogerson at the Quick Zip and he briefly passed by her not saying a word or looking her in the eye. Caitlin realizes that she must prepare herself for the next time she sees Rogerson.

At the end of the book, Caitlin is released but before she goes she takes a picture of the new her, and compares it to the old picture she once ripped but has put back together. Her family has a welcome home party with a special guest, Cass.

Characters
 Caitlin O'Koren – Caitlin is sixteen years old. Her older sister, Cassandra, ran away the morning of her sixteenth birthday. Her best friend is Rina. Rina made her try out for the cheerleading squad, which Caitlin hates. Throughout the story, she starts to smoke marijuana, and later uses it as a way to escape the pain of her abusive relationship with her boyfriend, Rogerson. At the end of the book, Caitlin goes to a rehab clinic for marijuana and Rogerson's abuse towards her.
 Rogerson Biscoe –  Rogerson has dreadlocks and is described as very attractive and charming. Rogerson is a drug dealer who is abused by his father. He is from a wealthy family and lives in the pool house behind his parents' house. He begins dating Caitlin and falls in love with her. He only admits that he loves her after the first time he hits her. He hits her when she does something "wrong" like talking to another guy, or being late to meet him. He begins to hit her harder as their relationship progresses but he refrains from hitting her where it was visible to avoid suspicion. He introduces Caitlin to marijuana. 
 Cassandra "Cass" O'Koren – Cassandra is Caitlin's older sister that ran away from home on Caitlin's birthday to be with her boyfriend, Adam, instead of going to Yale. Cass was very involved at school and has overshadowed Caitlin in terms of accomplishment. Caitlin is at a complete loss when her sister suddenly disappears.  She works on a TV show that her boyfriend breaks up fights on called "The Lamont Whipper Show", which is similar to The Jerry Springer Show. The show dealt with different people's situations and relationships to each other.
 Rina Swain – Rina is Caitlin's best friend. She is said to have strawberry blonde curls. She is a cheerleader like Caitlin and is hated by many girls because she is very pretty and has many boyfriends. Her mother is very unsuccessful in marriage. Caitlin says Rina's mother only marries men for money, not out of love.
 Mike Evans – A guy Caitlin was supposed to become a couple with but ditched him to leave with Rogerson on the night of the party. He is on the football team and is friends with Rina and her boyfriend, Bill
 Corinna – Corrina is Caitlin's new friend. She lives in a small farm house with her boyfriend, Dave. She attended the same high school as Caitlin and Cass, but was disowned by her parents after running off to live a life similar to Cass's – away from the pressure to be perfect, away from smothering parents. Corinna dreams of getting away to California. She also smokes pot and has jingly-jangly bangles which is her trademark throughout the novel.
 Boo Connell – Basically known as a hippie, she is a next-door neighbor and cares about Cass and Caitlin. She is their mother's best friend and was there for her when Cass first ran away.
 Margaret O'Koren – Cass and Caitlin's mother. After Cass runs away, she is extremely disappointed and depressed. Once Caitlin joins the cheer leading squad, she gets so wrapped up in being a part of her life. She watches The Lamont Whipper Show to see Cass.
 Stuart Connell – Boo's husband. Ran away with Boo when they were 18.
 Dave – Corinna's boyfriend who can't hold a job, and spent bill money on drugs. Corinna finally left him after not being able to pay those bills.

Allusions to other books
Rogerson is Marshall's roommate in Lock and Key who Ruby mentions was charged with assault.
Boo Connell is mentioned in Just Listen. Owen's mother and his sister are said to be taking mother-daughter classes run by her.
Rogerson is mentioned again in Saint Anything when Sydney's mom is planning a get together for the families who are attending the graduation at the  Lincoln Correctional facility where her brother Peyton is located.

References

2000 American novels
American young adult novels